Vaskino is a rural locality (a village) in Kochyovskoye Rural Settlement, Kochyovsky District, Perm Krai, Russia. The population was 22 as of 2010. There are 3  streets.

Geography 
Vaskino is located 17 km southeast of Kochyovo (the district's administrative centre) by road. Sepol is the nearest rural locality.

References 

Rural localities in Kochyovsky District